The Bombardment of Kagoshima, also known as the , was a military engagement fought between Britain and the Satsuma Domain in Kagoshima from 15 to 17 August 1863. The British were attempting to extract compensation and legal justice from daimyo Shimazu Tadayoshi for the 1862 Namamugi Incident, when a Royal Navy fleet commanded by Sir Augustus Leopold Kuper was fired on from Satsuma coastal batteries near Kagoshima. The British responded by bombarding the city in retaliation, but were unable to gain a conclusive victory and retreated two days later. The Satsuma declared victory and after negotiations fulfilled some British demands for the Namamugi Incident.

Background

On 14 September 1862, a confrontation occurred in Japan between a British merchant, Charles Lennox Richardson, and the entourage of Shimazu Hisamitsu, father and regent of Satsuma daimyo Shimazu Tadayoshi. After Richardson ignored warnings to stay out of the entourage's way while travelling on a road near Kawasaki, Kanagawa, he was killed by Hisamitsu's retainers under the traditional Kiri-sute gomen right, which allowed samurai to kill anyone in a lower social class for perceived disrespect. Richardson's murder sparked outrage from Westerners in Japan due to its violation of the extraterritoriality they enjoyed under terms of the "unequal treaties". 

Edward St. John Neale, the British chargé d'affaires, demanded from the Bakufu (the central government of the Tokugawa shogunate) an apology and indemnity of £100,000 as reparations for Richardson's murder; the sum demanded by Neale represented roughly a third of the annual revenues of the Bakufu. Neale also threatened to the Japanese capital of Edo with a naval bombardment if the indemnity was not paid, and further demanded that the Satsuma Domain arrest and place on trial the perpetrators of Richardson's murder, along with £25,000 compensation for the surviving victims of the incident and the relatives of Richardson. 

At the time, the Bakufu was led by Ogasawara Nagamichi, governing in the absence of Shogun Tokugawa Iemochi, who was then in Kyoto. Eager to resolve the dispute over Richardson's murder, Ogasawara entered into a negotiation with France and Great Britain on 2 July 1863 onboard the French Navy warship Sémiramis. The European participants in the negotiations were Neale, Gustave Duchesne de Bellecourt, Benjamin Jaurès and Sir Augustus Leopold Kuper. Ogasawara issued an apology for the murder and paid the indemnity demanded by Neale. 

However, the Satsuma Domain refused to comply with Neale's demands for an apology, £25,000 in compensation and placing the two samurai responsible for Richardson's murder on trial, arguing that disrespect to the daimyo was typically sanctioned by the death of the offending parties. Legally, their argument was invalid, as Westerners in Japan were exempted from Japanese laws and customs due to extraterritoriality due to various treaties signed between the Bakufu and Western powers since the beginning of the Bakumatsu period. Traditional Japanese laws did not typically apply to foreigners in Japan, but the Satsuma Domain felt it could not be seen submitting to Western demands during a heightened period of anti-foreigner sentiment in Japan; Neale, for his part, was keen to take a stand against attacks against foreigners on Japanese soil.

Several violent confrontations between Westerners and the Japanese had already occurred throughout the country during this period, spurred on by Emperor Kōmei's 1863 "Order to expel barbarians". The Kanmon Straits had witnessed several attacks on American, Dutch and French merchant ships, which prompted punitive expeditions by these countries, with U.S. Navy frigate USS Wyoming, Dutch Navy warship Medusa, and French Navy warships Tancrède and Dupleix launching attacks on Japanese positions. Eventually, on 14 August, a multinational fleet consisting of American, French, British and Dutch warships commenced the Shimonoseki campaign to prevent further attacks on western shipping there, which succeeded.

Further negotiations

Following protracted and fruitless negotiations with the Satsuma Domain that had taken over a year, Neale eventually had had enough. Under instructions from his superiors in the British government, he ordered Kuper to use military action to compel Satsuma into complying with his demands. After being informed of the British plans, the Bakufu asked for a delay in its implementation:

On the 5th, a Bakufu vice-minister from Edo visited Neale, but far from further opposing the planned British expedition against the Satsuma Domain, actually informed Neale that the Tokugawa shogunate intended to send one of its warships to join forces with Kuper's squadron. The steamer in question, however, ultimately did not join the expedition.

British departure

Kuper's Royal Navy squadron left Yokohama on August 6. It was composed of the flagship HMS Euryalus (with Neale on board), HMS Pearl, HMS Perseus, HMS Argus, HMS Coquette, HMS Racehorse and the gunboat HMS Havock.  They sailed for Kagoshima and anchored in the deep waters of Kinko Bay on August 11. Satsuma Domain envoys came aboard Euryalus and letters were exchanged, with Kuper pressing for a resolution satisfactory to his demands within 24 hours. The Satsuma Domain prevaricated, refusing to comply for various reasons.

Bombardment

After Kuper's deadline expired without a satisfactory conclusion to his demands, he decided to proceed with the plans to punish the Satsuma Domain. His squadron weighed anchor and proceeded to seize three British-built merchant steamers lying at anchor in Kagoshima harbour which were owned by the Satsuma Domain: the Sir George Grey, Contest and England, with the ships having an aggregate value of £200,000. Kuper intended to use the three seized merchantmen as a bargaining chip in any future negotiations. 

In response, the Satsuma Domain's military forces responded by waiting until a typhoon started before launching an artillery bombardment from their coastal batteries towards the British (the city had been evacuated prior to the engagement). Surprised by the hostility, Kuper's squadron responded by confiscating as much valuable materiel as possible from the three captured steamers before setting them on fire. 

The British then spent approximately two hours readying their ships for battle (as they had not expected to enter into a military confrontation) before forming a line of battle, which sailed along the Kagoshima coast and fired a combination of shells and round shot towards the coastal batteries. Artillery fire from the Havoc set five Ryukyuan trading junks, which were not involved in the engagement, on fire. The Satsuma coastal batteries were slowly silenced by the British, though the fact that Kuper's squadron was not expecting protracted resistance meant his ships slowly ran low on supplies and ammunition, and eventually he gave the order to retreat. The engagement resulted in 5 killed on the Satsuma side and 13 killed and 69 wounded on the British side, including Captain Josling of the Euryalus and his second-in-command Commander Wilmot, both decapitated by the same cannonball.

Additionally, roughly 500 Minka houses in Kagoshima, making up approximately 5% of the city's urban area, was destroyed by the bombardment, along with the Ryukyuan embassy. The British retreat was face-saving for the Satsuma Domain, who claimed the engagement as a victory by taking into account the relative number of casualties. Kuper's squadron did not land marines or seize cannons from the coastal batteries (which would have signalled a clear British victory), Kuper having decided that the bombardment was enough.

Aftermath

Satsuma eventually decided to give in to Neale's demands and paid £25,000 to the British (which they borrowed from the Bakufu and never repaid due to the fall of the Tokugawa shogunate in 1869 and its replacement by the Meiji government). They never identified or placed on trial Richardson's killers, but despite this, the reparation received was enough for Britain to sign a treaty with the Satsuma Domain to supply the latter with steam warships. Ironically, the conflict became the starting point of a friendly relationship between the Satsuma Domain and Britain, which became major allies in the ensuing Boshin War. From the start, the Satsuma Province had generally been in favour of the opening and westernization of Japan. An interesting historical footnote to this incident was that a teenage Tōgō Heihachirō was manning one of the cannons used to defend the port, and is reported to have attributed his future career as head and "father" of the Imperial Japanese Navy to this moment.

See also

 Ishibashi Park
 Japan–United Kingdom relations
 Shimazu clan

Notes

Bibliography
 De Lange, William (2020).  The Namamugi Incident: The Murder that Sparked a War, Toyo Press. 
 .
 .
 Polak, Christian (2001).  Soie et lumières: L'âge d'or des échanges franco-japonais (des origines aux années 1950). Tokyo: Chambre de Commerce et d'Industrie Française du Japon, Hachette, Fujin Gahōsha (アシェット婦人画報社).
 
 Rennie, David Field (2005), The British Arms in North China and Japan Originally pub. 1864.  Facsimile, Adamant Media Corporation, 
 Satow, Ernest.  "The Bombardment of Kagoshima", Chapter VIII, A Diplomat in Japan.
 Totman, Conrad 1980 The collapse of the Tokugawa Bakufu, 1862–1868 University of Hawai Press, Honolulu, 
 .

1863 in Japan
1863 in the British Empire
19th-century military history of the United Kingdom
August 1863 events
Bakumatsu
Kagoshima
Kagoshima
Conflicts in 1863
Foreign relations of the Tokugawa shogunate
Japan–United Kingdom military relations
Kagoshima
Punitive expeditions of the United Kingdom
Bombardment of Kagoshima
Wars involving Japan